A maternity home, or maternity housing program, is a form of supportive housing provided to pregnant women. Maternity housing programs support a woman in need of a stable home environment to reach her goals in a variety of areas including education, employment, financial stability, prenatal care, and more. There are over 400 maternity homes in the United States ranging in size and criteria for admittance.  Staffing model is a primary way that maternity homes differ. The three major staffing models are houseparents (e.g. a married couple), live-in staff, and shift staff. Additionally, there are a limited number of maternity housing program who operate as a "shepherding" or "host" home. In the "host home" model, women are connected to screened households that offer to provide housing. 
 
In other countries, the term "maternity home" may refer to the above described or may describe a temporary residence for pregnant women awaiting birth, which might include women who must travel long distances for medical care or high-risk pregnancies who are receiving frequent care. Maternity homes are not to be confused with maternity hospitals, or other facilities in which women give birth. Another sort of temporary housing for pregnant women are the maternity hostels that have become widespread in countries such as India where commercial surrogacy is big business.

History
Maternity homes used to be known as homes for unwed mothers, as illegitimacy was (and in some places still is) a social taboo.

United States

The Salvation Army opened its first one in 1886. Other examples include Bethany Home in Minneapolis, later renamed Harriet Walker Hospital. 

Prior to the 1980s, housing for pregnant women was offered in larger, institution-like settings that were strongly adoption-oriented. In these homes, confidentiality was a priority due to the social stigma around unwed births and the policies reflected the adoption laws and practices of the time.  It is from these settings that many of the misconceptions around maternity homes that continue to this day grew (e.g. forcing women into adoption, not allowing adoptive mothers to see their child, not providing any information about placement.)  

In the 1970s and 1980s, the adoption process began to grow in flexibility (e.g. changes to father notification, no longer making short-term placements of adopted babies into foster care, making use of probate court adoptions rather than solely via adoption agencies, increased inter-state adoptions.) Offering a more flexible housing option via a new model paralleled the more flexible adoption process.  The large, institutional maternity homes began to close during this time.

In the early 1970s, Anne and Jim Pierson were pioneers in the host home model and publicly recognized by President Reagan for their family-style method of welcoming pregnant women. Shepherding or host homes grew in popularity in the 1980s and 1990s as a new type of housing resource. In this model, pregnant women in crisis pregnancies were housed within the spare bedrooms in the homes of passionate volunteers during their pregnancy. Several longstanding maternity homes used some version of a host home living environment as the launching point for developing a housing program. Additionally, many founders of longstanding maternity homes (and other pregnancy help organizations) began by welcoming women into their own home.

Ireland

Some maternity homes, such as the Bon Secours Mother and Baby Home in Tuam, were found to have provided highly substandard care.

United Kingdom
The American Red Cross sponsored maternity hostels in London after World War I.

See also
Crisis pregnancy center

References

 
Midwifery
Human pregnancy